Augustenborg may refer to:
 Augustenborg, Denmark
 Augustenborg Municipality
 Augustenborg, Malmö
 Augustenburg Castle, eastern Karlsruhe, Germany
 Augustenborg Palace

People
Cara Augustenborg, Irish and American environmental scientist